Stub Jacobson was an American professional basketball player. He played for the Warren Penns in the National Basketball League for four games early in the 1937–38 season. He averaged 1.5 points per game.

References

Year of birth unknown
Year of death unknown
American men's basketball players
Basketball players from Pennsylvania
Centers (basketball)
Warren Penns players